is a Japanese swimmer, born in Ama County, Aichi. He won two medals at the 2010 Asian Games in Guangzhou, gold in the men's 400 m medley and bronze in the men's 200 m medley.

Horihata competed in the 2012 Summer Olympics, advancing to the final and finishing 6th in the 400 metre individual medley. He also swam on the Japanese team in the 4 × 200 metre freestyle relay that placed 9th in the heats and missed the top-8 cutoff for the final.

References

External links
 
 
 
 

1990 births
Living people
Japanese male medley swimmers
Japanese male freestyle swimmers
World Aquatics Championships medalists in swimming
Olympic swimmers of Japan
Swimmers at the 2012 Summer Olympics
Asian Games medalists in swimming
Swimmers at the 2010 Asian Games
Asian Games gold medalists for Japan
Medalists at the 2010 Asian Games
Universiade medalists in swimming
Asian Games bronze medalists for Japan
Universiade silver medalists for Japan
Universiade bronze medalists for Japan
People from Aichi Prefecture
Medalists at the 2009 Summer Universiade
Medalists at the 2011 Summer Universiade
21st-century Japanese people